Cyprien (ca. 1935–1994) and Daphrose Rugamba (ca. 1944–1994) were a married couple from Rwanda, who introduced the Catholic Charismatic Renewal and the Emmanuel Community to their country in 1990, and were assassinated in the Rwandan genocide of 1994. The cause for their canonization in the Catholic Church was opened in 2015.

Biography 
Cyprien [Sipiriyani] Rugamba attended primary in Nyabagabe. In September 1948, he was admitted to Saint Leon Minor Seminary of Kabgayi where he finished in 1954 and moved to Nyakibanda Major Seminary. He also studied history in Burundi and in Belgium. He had a talent for poetry, music, and choreography, with a particular interest for ancestral art forms in Rwanda. He served as director of the Rwandan National Institute for Scientific Studies in Butare.

Daphrose [Daforoza] Mukasanga was a school teacher, born in the same village of Cyanika in the south of Rwanda as Cyprien. They married in 1965, but the relationship was not easy; Cyprien neglected Daphrose and was unfaithful to her, leading to a separation. In 1982 Cyprien, who had lost his Catholic faith, had a religious experience which restored their marriage. They moved to Kigali, where they established a feeding center for street children.
They encountered the Emmanuel Community in 1989 through Fidesco and went on a pilgrimage to Paray-le-Monial. When they returned to Rwanda, they started a household (a weekly sharing group). The first Community Weekend took place on 22–23 September 1990, thereby establishing the Emmanuel Community in that nation.

The independence of the Republic of Rwanda led to ethnic tensions between the Hutu and Tutsi peoples. Cyprien and Daphrose advocated peace. Cyprien advised President Juvénal Habyarimana to stop the registration of ethnicity on identity cards. He was warned that this stance would place him on a hit list. The couple were killed, with six of their ten children, on 7 April 1994 - one day after the assassination of the president, which marked the start of the Rwandan genocide against Tutsis.

Legacy 
In 1992 the Rugambas started a center in Kigali to feed and educate street children. Since 1995, after the genocide, this center has been managed by Fidesco. It is now called Centre Cyprien et Daphrose Rugamba (CECYDAR). In 2015 Cyprien and Daphrose Rugamba were declared "heroic in virtue," marking the start of the formal process towards their canonization as saints recognised by the Catholic Church.

References

External links 

Cyprien et Daphrose Rugamba , official web site of the Emmanuel Community .
"I will enter the gates of heaven dancing", documentary (26 min.) of the life and work of Cyprien and Daphrose Rugamba.

People who died in the Rwandan genocide
Married couples
Servants of God
20th-century venerated Christians
20th-century Roman Catholic martyrs
1994 deaths
People from Southern Province, Rwanda